Michael Forbes (born 1952) is a politician from the state of New York.

Michael Forbes may also refer to:

Michael Forbes (farmer) (born 1952), Scottish farmer
Mickey Forbes, character in The Affairs of Jimmy Valentine
Mike Forbes (born 1957), ice hockey player